In/Casino/Out (stylized as in/CASINO/OUT) is the second full-length album by American post-hardcore band At the Drive-In, released on August 18, 1998, through Fearless Records. It was recorded as a live studio album, with the intention of better capturing the energy and sound of their live shows. The album marks a clear middle ground between the raw, lo-fi sound of their first album, Acrobatic Tenement, and the sleeker, more produced sound heard on Relationship of Command.

In 2016, Rolling Stone placed the album at #20 in their "40 Greatest Emo Albums of All Time" list.

Background and recording
During the recording of the album, the band faced a sort of crisis when they were unable to find a label that was able to release the record. By that point in time, Flipside, the label that issued Acrobatic Tenement, quit releasing records and Offtime Records, who released the band's El Gran Orgo the previous year, was not in the financial position to issue more releases. At one point the group considered to independently release the album themselves until Fearless Records offered their support.

Recording for the album took place in early June 1998 at Messenger's Studio, Hollywood California. The entire recording was done live by the band, with little to no overdubs. Production duties were held by Alex Newport with assistance by Doug Messenger at Harddrive Analog in North Hollywood. Newport also mixed the album "half asleep" at Paramount in Hollywood for around 21 hours total. In retrospect, vocalist Cedric Bixlar-Zavala felt that they were "rushed" and that they were unable to "execute maybe 30% of the ideas that were initially planned for the record because of a lack of time", however he did also point out that he felt the band worked very well in the end because of the pressure.

In/Casino/Out marks founding member Jim Ward's return to the band after not performing on record the previous year with El Gran Orgo, taking a year break from the group after the tour for Acrobatic Tenement. The track "Hourglass" marks his debut in performing lead vocals for the group.

Track listing

Personnel

 ATDI
Cedric Bixler-Zavala – lead vocals
Jim Ward – guitars, backing vocals; co-lead vocals, keyboards (on "Hourglass")
Omar Rodríguez-López – guitars
Paul Hinojos (credited as Pall) – bass guitar
Tony Hajjar – drums, percussion

 Additional musicians
Angel Marcelo Rodríguez-Cheverez (credited as Marcelo Rodche) – percussion (on "Chanbara")
Jeremy Ward – outro recording (on "Lopsided")

 Another personnel
Alex Newport – production, recording engineer, mixing
John Golden – mastering engineer
Taylor Crockett – photography
Travis Keller – photography
Emberly Modine – artwork, design
At the Drive-In – design
Cheryl Benson – layout

Chart performance

References

1998 albums
At the Drive-In albums
Albums produced by Alex Newport